Peter Heayne Joseph Sellers  (9 June 1921 – 22 April 2016) was a New Zealand sports broadcaster.

Early life
Born in the Wellington suburb of Lyall Bay, Sellers was educated at Rongotai College.

Broadcasting career
Sellers began working for the New Zealand Broadcasting Service (which later became the New Zealand Broadcasting Corporation) in Wellington in 1952, and moved to Dunedin in 1958. He became one of the country's leading sports broadcasters, retiring in 1987. While best known as a radio broadcaster, Sellers also presented a television sports show from the early 1960s until 1975.

Later life and death
In the 1994 New Year Honours, Sellers was awarded the Queen's Service Medal for public services. He died in Dunedin on 22 April 2016.

References

1921 births
2016 deaths
New Zealand broadcasters
People educated at Rongotai College
Recipients of the Queen's Service Medal
People from Wellington City
Mass media people from Dunedin